Mohammadabad-e Olya (also Romanized as Mohammadābād-e ‘Olyā; also known as Mohammadābād-e Bālā, Moḩammadābād-e Bālā, and Moḩammadābād-e Ţūlehgarī) is a village in Esmaili Rural District, Esmaili District, Anbarabad County, Kerman Province, Iran. At the 2006 census, its population was 248, in 46 families.

References 

Populated places in Anbarabad County